Werner Böhm, better known under his artist name Gottlieb Wendehals (5 June 1941 – 2 June 2020) was a German singer and musician.

Biography
Böhm was born in Thorn in German-occupied Poland. In the late 1950s, he was the pianist with the "Cabinet Jazzmen" in Hamburg until the early 1960s, at the time one of the most popular jazz bands in Northern Germany. From 1970 to 1971 he was a jazz pianist in Hamburg at "Jazz House", "Riverkasematten", "Logo", "Dennis Swing Club", "Cotton Club", "Remter" and in the legendary "Onkel Po". Böhm accompanied on piano singers such as Louis Armstrong, Ella Fitzgerald and Erroll Garner.

Böhm achieved his greatest commercial success with his character Gottlieb Wendehals, a bespectacled, bow-tie-wearing schlager singer with a chessboard pattern suit. His most successful hit "Polonäse Blankenese" spent nine weeks at the top of the German single charts in late 1981 and early 1982. Together with Karl Dall and Helga Feddersen he appeared in the comedy film Sunshine Reggae auf Ibiza (1983).

In 1982 he took part in the preliminaries of the Eurovision Song Contest with the song "Der Ohrwurm". He finished 11th in the second-last place. He was also involved, together with Michael Chambosse, as writer and composer of the song "Lady" (6th place), sung by his wife (at that time) Mary Roos and David Hanselmann. He died in Gran Canaria, Spain, three days short from his 79th birthday.

Discography

Singles 
 1979: Herbert
 1980: Morgens Fango – Abends Tango
 1981: Mensch ärgere Dich nicht
 1981: Polonäse Blankenese
 1982: Jap dadel dip, dadel dup dadel
 1982: Der Ohrwurm
 1982: Polonäse mit Getöse
 1982: Damenwahl
 1983: Schick, Schick Bum, Bum
 1984: Get On Up
 1984: I’m a Winner
 1985: Schlappi Räp met Klaus Schlappner
 1986: Alles hat ein Ende, nur die Wurst hat zwei
 1990: Wenn die Nordlichter feiern
 1990: Wenn die Kirschblüten blüh'n im Alten Land
 1997: Samba Ramba Zamba
 2000: Polonäse 2000
 2004: King of the Jungle (Werner Böhm vs. Gottlieb Wendehals)
 2004: Old Mac Donald
 2004: Summertime – Sunny Days (Werner Böhm vs. Gottlieb Wendehals)
 2006: Saalrunde
 2006: Tarzan ist wieder da
 2008: Fernsehen macht dumm dumm
 2010: Polonäse Blankenese (Haidie vs. Gottlieb Wendehals)
 2010: Der neue Böhm
 2011: Der Yeti (Es läuft ein Yeti durch die Serengeti)
 2011: Ein Eisbär in Sibirien
 2015: Gehen wir noch wohin

Albums 
 1979: Polonäse Blankenese
 1982: ErVolksLieder
 1982: Polonäse mit Getöse
 1983: Da kommt Freude auf
 1983: Gran Canaria
 1984: 84 AHEAD
 1988: Polonäse Blankenese
 1990: Freibier für Deutschland
 1991: Wenn die Kirschblüten blüh'n
 1998: Schmarozza
 2009: Darf ich bitten, Polonäse
 2020: Let's Party ohne Ende

References

External links 
 Gottlieb Wendehals – Werner Böhm – Das karierte Verhängnis
 
 
 Werner Böhm IMDb

21st-century German male singers
Schlager musicians
1941 births
2020 deaths
People from Toruń
20th-century German male singers